Mohammad Farooq Hussain Miyan Shaikh is an Indian politician. He was a Member of the Gujarat Legislative Assembly from the Kalupur Assembly constituency since 1998 to 2012. He is associated with the Indian National Congress.

References 

Living people
Members of the Gujarat Legislative Assembly
Year of birth missing (living people)